Vyacheslav Gryaznov (born 15 January 1982) is a Russian classical pianist, recording artist, transcriber, composer, and assistant professor of piano.  In 2006, he studied at the Moscow Conservatory under Yuri Slesarev and post-graduate studies in 2009. Since 2008, he has held the position of teaching assistant in the Piano Department of the Moscow Conservatory.  Beginning with the 2008/2009 concert season, V. Gryaznov has belonged to the Moscow Philharmonic Society which represents him in Russia. Since 2012, he has worked as a visiting professor of piano at Kurashiki Sakuyo University of Science and Arts in Japan. In 2014 Vyacheslav signed a contract with Schott Music, the leading publisher for classical and contemporary music.

Awards and prizes
 Rubinstein International Competition in Moscow (1997, 1st Prize)
 The First Russian President Award (1997)
 To the memory of Rachmaninov” Competition in Italy (1998, 1st Prize)
 Grant by V. Spivakov Foundation (1999–2003)
 Competition of Young Performers in Denmark (2001, Grand Prix)
 XXI Century Art» Competition in Ukraine (2001, Grand Prix)
 Tbilisi Competition (Georgia, 2001, «Audience Favourite» Prize)
 Grant by Russian Performing Art Foundation (2002)
 Yamaha Scholarship (2002)
 Grant by M. Rostropovich Foundation (H.Neuhaus award, 2002–2003)
 Sendai International Music Competition, Japan (2007, 6th Prize)
 Rachmaninov Competition in Moscow (2008, 2nd Prize)
 Honored Citizen of Bryansk (2011)
 New York Concert Artists & Associates Worldwide Debut Audition winner, Piano category (2016)

Recordings

In addition to extensive recordings of live performances, Vyacheslav Gryaznoff recorded the CD “To Rachmaninov and his beloved Ivanovka,” a collection of his own transcriptions and works by Rachmaninov; and Alexander Tchaikovsky’s Sonata No. 2 on the Firma Melodiya label. Gryaznov recorded his own piano transcriptions of Russian masterworks by Rachmaninov, Borodin, Prokofiev, Glinka and Tchaikovsky in a studio album released in 2018 under the label Steinway & Sons. In 2021, he released the CD "Western Piano Transcriptions" under the label Master Performers including piano arrangements of famous works by Mahler, Grieg, Debussy or Ravel.

Performances

As a soloist, Gryaznov has given numerous recitals throughout Russia, Ukraine, Georgia, Asia, and Europe, and has performed concertos with the Russian Philharmonic Orchestra in Tchaikovsky Concert Hall, Moscow; performed and conducted Mozart’s Concerto K. 449 in Vladimir at a concert of the “Stars of the XXI century” series; and the Wissembourg Symphony Orchestra.
His performance repertoire includes works that span the entire piano literature, from Monteverdi, Bach or Mozart to modern composers such as Ravel, Gershwin or Ginastera.

References

External links 
 Personal web site

Russian classical pianists
Male classical pianists
Living people
1982 births
21st-century classical pianists
21st-century Russian male musicians
Russian YouTubers
Music YouTubers